Pyumori Mehta Ghosh is an Indian film and television actress. She has appeared in various Indian Television Serials and Full length Hindi Feature Films. In 2016 she appeared in the Hindi film Sanam Teri Kasam. Currently she is playing Rama Ramesh Bhalla in Shaurya Aur Anokhi Ki Kahani. She has also appeared in various television serials, including Kitani Mohabbat Hai (season 2), and regularly appears on Savdhaan India and Crime Patrol.

Television serials
Pyumori Mehta Ghosh appeared in the following television serials:

 Kittie Party on Zee TV
 Grihasti on Star Plus
 Tere Liye on Star Plus (Balaji Telefilms 2010)
 Kitani Mohabbat Hai (season 2) on Imagine TV (Balaji Telefilms 2010)
 Ek Nayi Chhoti Si Zindagi on Zee TV (Hats Off Productions 2011)
 Iss Pyaar Ko Kya Naam Doon? on Star Plus (4 Lions Films 2011) 
 Looteri Dulhan on Imagine TV (B.A.G Films 2011)  
 Ek Ghar Banaunga on Star Plus (Village Boy 2013) 
 Uttaran as Divya Jogi Thakur (2014) on Colors TV
 Hello Pratibha on Zee TV (Shakuntalam Telefilms 2015)
 Tum Aise Hi Rehna on Sony TV (Rashmi Sharma Telefilms 2015)
 Reporters on Sony TV (Rose Movies 2015)
 Savdhaan India on Life OK (Baccha Dulha 2015)
 Crime Patrol on Sony TV (Rajesh S Wife Sejal's Miraculous Escape From Death - 19 August 2011 Episode, Principal Sexually Assaults a Teacher - 8 June 2012 Episode, What you See in The Mirror - 26 September 2014 Episode, Bharat Thakor's Mysterious Death - 12 November 2011 Episode, 12 and 13 March 2016 episode - named 'Manzil')
 Naagin 2 as Nidhi Manav Nikunj on Colors TV (Balaji Telefilms 2016-2017)
 Kundali Bhagya as Kareena Luthra on ZEE TV (Balaji Telefilms 2017)
 Naati Pinky Ki Lambi Love Story as Nalini Ram Kashyap on Colors TV (2020)
 Shaurya Aur Anokhi Ki Kahani as Rama Ramesh Bhalla on Star Plus (2020-2021)
 Nath – Zewar Ya Zanjeer as Janaki Avtar Singh Thakur on  Dangal (2021-2022)

Films
Pyumori Mehta Ghosh appeared in the following films:

 Full Length Hindi Film: Sanam Teri Kasam in 2016 
 SHORT FILM: Urban Ladder (Diwali Special 2015) 
. Full length movie @ISHQ TERA

Personal life
Proud mother of 3 children

References

External links
 

Living people
Indian television actresses
Indian film actresses
Actresses from Maharashtra
1976 births
21st-century Indian actresses
People from Solapur
Actors from Mumbai